The 15th Pan American Games were held in Rio de Janeiro, Brazil from 13 July 2007 to 29 July 2007. Panama competed with a total number of 70 (48 men and 22 women) athletes in 12 sports.

Medals

Gold

Men's Long Jump: Irving Saladino

Silver

Men's 400m Hurdles: Bayano Kamani

Results by event

Basketball

Men's team competition
Team roster
Joel Muñoz
Jair Jamel Peralta
Danilo Pinnock
Maximiliano Gómez Torres
Jamaal Levy
Jorsua Chambers
Reyjavick Degracia
Eduardo Isaac
Dionisio Gomez
Joel Isaac Tesis
José Lloreda
Desmond Smith
Head coach: Vincente Duncan

See also
 Panama at the 2008 Summer Olympics

External links
Rio 2007 Official website

Nations at the 2007 Pan American Games
2007 in Panamanian sport
2007